Morocco competed at the 1996 Summer Olympics in Atlanta, United States.

Medalists

Bronze
 Khalid Boulami — Athletics, Men's 5.000 metres
 Salah Hissou — Athletics, Men's 10.000 metres

Results by event

Athletics

Men 

Track and road events

Women 

Track and road events

Boxing

Gymnastics

Artistic 

Women

Judo 

Men

Tennis 

Men

Weightlifting

Wrestling 

Greco-Roman

References
Official Olympic Reports
International Olympic Committee results database

Nations at the 1996 Summer Olympics
1996 Summer Olympics
Summer Olympics